Shankarpalli railway station is located in Rangareddi district of Telangana State, India and serves Shankarpalli.

Overview
Shankarpalli is a station located in between Secunderabad Junction to Vikarabad Junction Railway Line. It is well connected to Bidar, Tandur, Secunderabad, Vijayawada, Guntur, Kazipet, Tirupati, Shiridi, Nizamabad, CSMT Kolhapur, Manuguru and Kakinada Port Railway Stations through passenger, express and super fast express trains.

References

External links
 

Railway stations in Ranga Reddy district
Secunderabad railway division